was a town located in Nishisonogi District, Nagasaki Prefecture, Japan.

As of 2003, the town had an estimated population of 16,995 and a density of 448.65 persons per km2. The total area was 37.88 km2.

On March 1, 2005, Tarami, along with the towns of Iimori, Konagai, Moriyama and Takaki (all from Kitatakaki District), was merged into the expanded city of Isahaya.

Dissolved municipalities of Nagasaki Prefecture